Peusangan Raya Football Club (or simply Peusangan Raya) is an Indonesian football team based at Cot Girek Paya Kareung Stadium, Peusangan District, Bireuen Regency, Aceh. This team competes in Liga 3 Aceh zone.

References

External links

Football clubs in Indonesia
Football clubs in Aceh
Association football clubs established in 2013
2013 establishments in Indonesia